Moqbelabad may refer to:

Moqbelabad, Fars
Moqbelabad, Qom